Kuppuzhaan or Kuppilan is a village in the Valikaamam South division of Jaffna district. The toponym nowadays is often written as Kuppizhaan.  It is an agricultural village consisting mainly of vegetable farms, Tobacco, Palmyra gardens. The most of the people are Hindus.

Villages in Jaffna District
Valikamam South DS Division